The WWC Caribbean Tag Team Championship was a third-string tag team championship that was defended in the World Wrestling Council.

Title history

References

External links
wrestling-titles.com

Regional professional wrestling championships
Tag team wrestling championships
World Wrestling Council championships